Sarah Allen is a Canadian actress. She studied acting at the National Theatre School of Canada and graduated in 2002.

Being Human 

Allen is perhaps best known for playing vampire Rebecca Flynt on SyFy's Being Human.  For the role, she watched some of the original BBC version of the series and also researched vampire mythology.

About her character Rebecca, Allen has said: "She definitely starts the series with a cross to bear.. you know, really angry and kind of 'guard up', but I think she makes a real effort to try to be good.  She does make an effort to be good, and she wants to be, and she fails constantly, but I think that even [her] attempts in changing Bernie, the little boy, to a vampire...[were] done with good intentions...she really wanted to care for someone."

About Rebecca's relationship with Aidan, she has said:  "She keeps on fumbling through her existence as a vampire. She keeps trying to get involved with Aidan's life and just keeps messing up."

She also mentioned once that having to drink fake blood on Being Human was like "drinking a tube of toothpaste".

Filmography

Film

Television

References

External links 

 Sarah Allen at The South African TV Authority

1980 births
Living people
Canadian film actresses
Canadian television actresses
National Theatre School of Canada alumni
21st-century Canadian actresses
People from Nelson, British Columbia